Two steamships were named Jacona:

, launched in 1889 as Saint Marnock she was renamed Jacona in 1899 and sunk on 12 August 1915
, launched in 1918 as a Design 1014 ship she was converted into a powership in 1930

Ship names